Crucial Moments is an EP by the Bouncing Souls that was released on March 15, 2019. The six song EP was released as part of a celebration of the band's 30th anniversary. The band also released a book detailing their history and supported both releases with a world tour. The title track was released as the first single and a music video was also released for the song to promote the EP.

Track listing

Personnel
Greg Attonito – vocals
Pete Steinkopf – guitar
Bryan Kienlen – bass
George Rebelo – drums

Charts

References

The Bouncing Souls EPs
2019 EPs
Albums produced by Will Yip